Em Dia com a Rebeldia (Portuguese for "Up to Date with the Rebelliousness") is the second and final solo studio album by Brazilian singer Ciro Pessoa, released in 2010 by independent label Rosa Celeste, which was founded by former Titãs member Arnaldo Antunes. Co-produced by Roy Cicala, who previously worked with bands and artists such as John Lennon, Aerosmith, Bruce Springsteen and The Jimi Hendrix Experience, it is more experimental and psychedelic than Pessoa's previous album, drawing influences from Pink Floyd, Os Mutantes and Secos & Molhados, and featuring imagery evoking the paintings of Salvador Dalí and René Magritte. A music video, directed by Pessoa and Carlito Moreira, was made for the track "Despejar".

The album is available for free download on Ciro Pessoa's official SoundCloud page. In 2019, the album was re-issued digitally in all streaming media platforms by Curumim Records, noticeably lacking the track "Planos".

Track listing

Personnel
 Ciro Pessoa – vocals, acoustic guitar
 Marco Lafico – bass, electric guitar
 Zé Mazzei – bass
 Flávio Cavichioli – drums, percussion
 Apollo 9 – guitar, keyboards, backing vocals, production
 Luciana Andrade – backing vocals
 Priscicodélica – backing vocals
 Roy Cicala – backing vocals, mixing, production
 Carlos Freitas – mastering
 Cláudio Elizabetsky – photography
 Carolina Vicentim – cover art

References

External links
 Ciro Pessoa's SoundCloud profile

2010 albums
Ciro Pessoa albums
Portuguese-language albums
Albums free for download by copyright owner